Melaleuca bracteata, commonly known as the black tea-tree, river tea-tree or mock olive is a plant in the myrtle family, Myrtaceae and is endemic to northern Australia. It is an adaptable species in cultivation and a number of cultivars have been developed.

Description
Its bark is rough and dark grey in colour. The leaves are spirally arranged around the stem and crowded together. The upper surface of the leaf is hairy, especially when young, with many oil-dots.

The black tea-tree flowers profusely. Each flower usually has a leaf at its base and the petals are shed soon after the flower opens.

Taxonomy and naming
Melaleuca bracteata was first described in 1858 by Ferdinand von Mueller in Fragmenta phytographiae Australiae from a specimen collected near Moreton Bay in Queensland. The specific epithet (bracteata) is derived from the Latin word bractea, meaning "bract".

Distribution and habitat
Black tea-tree occurs in Western Australia, the Northern Territory, and from north-east Queensland southwards to the Macleay River in New South Wales.  It grows near the coast and inland, along stream banks and in wet sites. In New South Wales it has been recorded on the Northern Tablelands, North Coast and North West Slopes biogeographic regions.<ref name=PlantNET>{{cite web|last1=Wilson|first1=Peter G.|title=Melaleuca bracteata|url=http://plantnet.rbgsyd.nsw.gov.au/cgi-bin/NSWfl.pl?page=nswfl&lvl=sp&name=Melaleuca~bracteata|publisher=PlantNET|accessdate=1 March 2015}}</ref> In Western Australia it occurs in the Kimberley and in the Carnarvon and Pilbara biogeographic regions. There are also disjunct populations in South Australia.

Conservation status
This species is classified as "not threatened" in Western Australia by the Government of Western Australia Department of Parks and Wildlife.

Uses
HorticultureM. bracteata'' is a useful tree in cultivation because it will grow almost anywhere and because of its compact shape and many flowers. Garden cultivars that have been developed include "Revolution Gold", "Revolution Green" and a dwarf form called "Golden Gem".

Indigenous use
It has been used in smoking medicine in the Northern Territory and for making numerous household items.

Essential oils
There are four chemotypes of oil based on elemicin or eugenol that are present in the plant. Methyl eugenol in the leaves can be used in insecticides, perfumes and soap.

Gallery

References 

bracteata
Myrtales of Australia
Flora of the Northern Territory
Flora of Queensland
Flora of Western Australia
Flora of New South Wales
Garden plants of Australia
Ornamental trees
Plants described in 1858
Taxa named by Ferdinand von Mueller